Mykyta Oleksandrovych Yakubenko (born 15 October 2000) is a Ukrainian professional footballer who plays as a goalkeeper for Ukrainian club Mariupol.

References

External links
 
 

2000 births
Living people
Footballers from Donetsk
Ukrainian footballers
Association football goalkeepers
FC Kramatorsk players
FC Yarud Mariupol players
Ukrainian First League players
Ukrainian Second League players